The 2021 Colombian Women's Football League (officially known as the Liga Femenina BetPlay Dimayor 2021 for sponsorship purposes) was the fifth season of Colombia's top-flight women's football league. The season started on 10 July and ended on 12 September 2021.

Deportivo Cali won their first title in the competition, defeating the defending champions Santa Fe in the double-legged final series by a 6–3 aggregate score.

Format
On 29 April 2021, the División Mayor del Fútbol Profesional Colombiano (DIMAYOR) confirmed the format for the 2021 Liga Femenina season, following a meeting of its Board of Competition. For this season the league would have 12 teams competing, which were split into three groups of four where they would play each other in a double round-robin tournament. The top two teams in each group as well as the two best third-placed teams would advance to the quarter-finals, with the winners advancing to the semi-finals. The winners of each semi-final would qualify for the finals to decide the champions. All rounds in the knockout stage would be played on a home-and-away, double-legged basis. The champions and runners-up qualified for the 2021 Copa Libertadores Femenina.

Due to the withdrawal of Cortuluá, DIMAYOR announced changes to the competition format on 17 June 2021. The remaining 11 clubs were split into two groups, one of which would be made up of six teams and the other one containing five teams. Teams would play each one of the teams in their group twice (once at home and once away), with teams in group A having two bye matchdays for a total of 10 matches. The top two teams in each group advanced to the semi-finals, with their winners playing the final.

Teams 
12 DIMAYOR affiliate clubs were originally expected to take part in the competition with their women's teams. Out of the 13 clubs that competed in the previous season, neither Deportivo Pasto nor Junior fielded a team in this edition, whilst Cortuluá were to return to the competition. However, on 8 June 2021 Cortuluá withdrew from the competition owing to financial reasons, with which the number of participant clubs went down to 11.

Stadia and locations

First stage
The first stage started on 10 July and consisted of one group of five teams and one group of six. It ended on 29 August with the top two teams from each group advancing to the knockout stage.

Group A

Group B

Knockout stage

Bracket

Semi-finals

|}

First leg

Second leg

Finals

Deportivo Cali won 6–3 on aggregate.

Top scorers

Source: Fémina Fútbol

See also
 Colombian Women's Football League

References

External links 
 Dimayor's official website 

Col
W
2021